Yanamauras (possibly from Quechua Yana Mawras, yana black) is a volcano in the Andes of Peru, about  high. It is situated in the "Valley of the Volcanoes"  in the Arequipa Region, Castilla Province, Andagua District. Yanamauras lies southwest of the Puca Mauras volcano and east of the  Ticsho volcano.

References

Volcanoes of Peru
Mountains of Arequipa Region
Mountains of Peru
Landforms of Arequipa Region